Shop is a hamlet in Morwenstow civil parish, north of Bude in Cornwall, England, United Kingdom. OS grid reference is SS2214.

Shop lies within the Cornwall Area of Outstanding Natural Beauty (AONB).

References

Hamlets in Cornwall
Morwenstow